The Day After is a 1983 television film.

The Day After may also refer to:

 The Day After (1909 film), starring Blanche Sweet
 The Day After (2017 film), a 2017 South Korean film
 The Day After (album), an album by Twista
 The Day After: Fight for Promised Land, an alternate title for Cuban Missile Crisis: The Aftermath, a video game

See also
 The Day After Tomorrow (disambiguation)